Mazel Group Engineering is a Barcelona based design studio specialising in concept cars and engineering solutions.

Concept cars
 Mazel Identity i1
 Mazel Sportiva Latina
 Mazel JAVX (a "Journey adventure vehicle")
 Mazel HS 21 GTS
 Mazel HS K8 Luxury Berlina
 Mazel HS 21

In collaboration
 Mazel-Lancia Grandturismo Stilnovo
 Mazel-Nissan Micra Sport Concept Car

External links
 Mazel

Automotive companies of Spain
Companies based in Barcelona
Concept cars